Abraham Edwards may refer to:
 Abraham Edwards (Massachusetts politician)
 Abraham Edwards (Michigan politician)